General John Thomas de Burgh, 13th and 1st Earl of Clanricarde PC (Ire) (22 September 1744 – 27 July 1808), styled The Honourable until 1797, was an Irish peer and soldier who was Governor of County Galway (1798–1808) and a member of the Privy Council of Ireland (1801).

Career

De Burgh raised the 88th Regiment of Foot, later renamed the Connaught Rangers, in 1793. Having commanded this regiment, he became Colonel of the 66th (Berkshire) Regiment of Foot (1794–1808) and later Governor of Hull (1801–1808). In 1796, he was in command in Corsica under Sir Gilbert Elliot-Murray-Kynynmound as Viceroy of the Anglo-Corsican Kingdom and, with Commodore Horatio Nelson, planned an attack to re-take Leghorn (Livorno) in Tuscany. He subsequently removed the remaining military detachments from Corsica to Elba and evacuated the latter island in January 1797. He was promoted to full General of the Army in 1803.

De Burgh was also a keen cricketer. He played for Surrey in 1773 but was possibly a guest player as his name only occurs a handful of times in match reports. His contribution to the sport was as a Hambledon Club member. He joined prior to June 1772 when the club's minutes began; and was President of the club in 1784.

After the death of his elder brother, Henry, 12th Earl and 1st Marquess of Clanricarde, in 1797, John inherited only the Earldom (of the first creation of 1543), not the Marquessate. In 1800, he was made Earl of Clanricarde (by a second creation) in the Peerage of Ireland, with a remainder, failing male issue of his own, to his daughters Lady Hester Catherine de Burgh (wife of Howe Browne, 2nd Marquess of Sligo) and Lady Emily de Burgh, and the heirs male of their bodies according to priority of birth.

de Burgh was elected as one of the 28 original Irish Representative Peers in 1800, and became a Privy Councillor in 1801. He was made Governor and Custos Rotulorum (1798–1808) of County Galway.

Family
Married to Elizabeth, a daughter of Sir Thomas Burke, 1st Baronet, he was succeeded by his son, Ulick John. The couple also had two daughters, Lady Hester, Marchioness of Sligo, and Lady Emily, Countess of Howth.

Burgh was a member of the Anglican Church, while his wife was a Catholic.

Honours and arms
PC (Ire): Privy Counsellor, 1801

Arms

Ancestry

References

1744 births
1808 deaths
People from County Galway
18th-century Anglo-Irish people
19th-century Anglo-Irish people
Irish Anglicans
British Army generals
88th Regiment of Foot (Connaught Rangers) officers
Royal Berkshire Regiment officers
Members of the Irish House of Lords
Irish representative peers
Members of the Privy Council of Ireland
English cricketers
Surrey cricketers
English cricketers of 1701 to 1786
Hambledon cricketers
John
Earls of Clanricarde